Gandara Diversion Road is a  national secondary road in the town of Gandara, Samar in the Philippines.

The entire road is designated as National Route 677 (N677) of the Philippine highway network. Prior to the newly assigned number routes assigned by the Department of Public Works and Highways for 2017, it was originally unnumbered and previously classified as a tertiary national road.

Route description
As much like other diversion roads in the country, the road bypasses the town proper of Gandara. Travelers from Calbayog and most of the travelers from Luzon cut the travel time from Maharlika Highway, which goes into the town proper. Most of the road is likely a scenic route where it passes through the green hilly landscape and palm trees.

Intersections

References

Roads in Samar (province)